This is a timeline of punk rock, from its beginnings in the early 1960s to the present time. Bands or albums listed before 1974 are of diverse genres and are retrospectively called by their genre name that was used during the era of their release.

Protopunk

1950s 
1953

 Songs
 "Love My Baby" by Little Junior's Blue Flames

1954

 Songs
 "Cotton Crop Blues" by James Cotton

1956

 Songs
 "Train Kept A-Rollin'" by Johnny Burnette and the Rock and Roll Trio

1957
 Songs
"Louie Louie" by Richard Berry

1958
Bands formed
 The Fabulous Wailers
Paul Revere & the Raiders

Songs
 "Rumble" (instrumental) by Link Wray & His Ray Men
 "Love Me" by Jerry Lott (as the Phantom)

1959
Bands formed
 The Kingsmen

1960s

1960 
 Bands formed
 The Sonics
 Songs
 Rollin' Rock by the Tielman Brothers

1961 
 Bands formed
Sam the Sham & The Pharaohs
 Les Blousons noirs
 Songs
Eddie Sois Bon

1962 
 Bands formed
 ? and the Mysterians
 The Standells
Songs
"The Girl Can't Dance"

1963 
Bands formed
The Kinks
 The Iguanas
The Rockin' Ramrods
 Songs
Surfin' Bird

1964 
 Bands formed
The Who
The Troggs
Them
The Bad Seeds
The Hangmen
The Shadows of Knight
The Mothers Of Invention
Captain Beefheart and His Magic Band
The Fugs
The Velvet Underground
Alice Cooper
Amboy Dukes
MC5
The Haunted
The Monks
Los Saicos
 Songs
You Really Got Me
All Day and All of the Night
 "The Witch" (song)

1965 
Bands formed
Small Faces
Stack Waddy
Love
The Chocolate Watchband
The Seeds
The Flamin' Groovies
The 13th Floor Elevators
 Evil
The Night Walkers
Songs
My Generation
Demolición
 El Entierro de los Gatos
The Train Kept A-Rollin'
Albums
 The Sonics – Here Are the Sonics
 The Fugs - The Fugs First Album

1966 
Bands formed
John's Children
The Deviants
The Music Machine
 The Squires
The Moving Sidewalks
 The Zakary Thaks
 Blue Cheer
Albums
 The 13th Floor Elevators - The Psychedelic Sounds of the 13th Floor Elevators
 Question Mark & the Mysterians – 96 Tears
 Love – Love
 The Monks – Black Monk Time
 The Music Machine – (Turn On) The Music Machine

1967 
 Bands formed
T. Rex
David Peel & The Lower East Side Band
 The Stooges
 The Up
Albums
The Velvet Underground – The Velvet Underground & Nico

1968 
 Bands formed
Edgar Broughton Band
 The Dogs
Can (band)
Black Sabbath
Albums
Blue Cheer - Vincebus Eruptum 
 The Velvet Underground – White Light/White Heat
The Deviants - Ptooff! and Disposable (album)

1969 
 Bands formed
 Hawkwind
 Crushed Butler

 Albums
 MC5 – Kick Out the Jams
 The Stooges – The Stooges

1970s

1970 
 Bands formed
Pink Fairies
Shagrat (band)
Third World War (band)
Kilburn and the High Roads
 The Modern Lovers
 Suicide
 Figures of Light
 Ton Steine Scherben
 Albums
 MC5 – Back in the USA
 The Stooges – Funhouse

Early Punk

1971 

 Bands formed
 New York Dolls
 Death
 NEU!

1972 
 Bands formed
 Cock Sparrer
 DEVO
 electric eels
 Neon Boys
 Swell Maps
 Sniper
 Albums
 NEU! – NEU!

1973 
 Bands formed
 The Saints
 Simply Saucer
 Television
The Punks
 Tiger Lily (later became Ultravox!)
 Zolar X
 Albums
 New York Dolls – New York Dolls
 The Stooges – Raw Power

1974 
 Bands formed
 Blondie
 The Dictators
 Patti Smith Group
 Pure Hell
 Rocket from the Tombs
 Ramones
 The Stranglers
 Talking Heads
 Radio Birdman
 The 101'ers
Albums
 New York Dolls – Too Much Too Soon
Events
 Television and Ramones start performing at CBGB.
Songs
 "Damned Flame" by Blast
 Johnny Moped

1975 
 Bands formed
 The Adicts
 Big Balls and the Great White Idiot
 The Boomtown Rats
 Cherry Vanilla
 The Heartbreakers
 London SS
 Motörhead
 Negative Trend
 The Nuns
 Pere Ubu
 Richard Hell and the Voidoids
 The Runaways
 The Screamers
 Sex Pistols
 Sham 69
 The Suicide Commandos
 Teenage Head
 Throbbing Gristle
 The Undertones
 Slaughter & The Dogs
 The Weirdos
Albums
 Peter Hammill – Nadir's Big Chance
 The Dictators – Go Girl Crazy!
 Patti Smith - Horses
Disbandments
 Rocket from the Tombs
 Events
 Television demo tape with Brian Eno is passed by Island Records. Richard Hell leaves.
 Sex Pistols play first gig opening for Bazooka Joe .
 Bazooka Joe singer Stuart Goddard changes name to Adam Ant, forms Adam and the Ants.

Punk rock

1976 
 Bands formed
 Abrasive Wheels
 The Adverts
 Alternative TV
 The Art Attacks
 The Boys
 Black Flag
 Buzzcocks
 Chelsea
 The Clash
 The Cramps
 Crime
 The Damned
 Dead Boys
 DMZ
 Eater
 The Fall
 The Flowers of Romance
 Gang of Four
 Generation X
 The Jam
 Johnny Moped
 London
 The Lurkers
 Madness
 Masters of the Backside
 The Mekons
 Métal Urbain
 Paraf
 Penetration
 Pork Dukes
 The Prefects
 The Rezillos
 Siouxsie and the Banshees
The Slickee Boys
 The Slits
 Subway Sect
 UK Subs
 Ultravox!
 The Vibrators
 VOM
 Warsaw (later to become Joy Division)
 Wire
 X-Ray Spex
 The Zeros
 Albums
 Ramones – Ramones
 The Runaways – The Runaways
 Blondie - Blondie
 Singles
 Ramones - Blitzkrieg bop (single released in February)
 The Damned – "New Rose"
 The Saints – "(I'm) Stranded" (recorded)
 Sex Pistols – "Anarchy in the U.K."
The Slickee Boys - Hot and Cool
Disbandments
 The 101ers
 Events
 Ramones release first single "Blitzkrieg Bop".
 Ramones first non-US appearance supporting Flamin' Groovies. Considered as a galvanizing event for UK punk scene.
 Sniffin' Glue, Mark Perry's punk fanzine published. Perry soon formed band, Alternative TV.
 Stiff Records is created in London signing almost exclusively punk and punk-inspired musicians.
 Sex Pistols, Damned, and The Clash begin Anarchy Tour. Most of the previously booked gigs refuse to let the bands play.
 Malcolm McLaren organizes the two-day 100 Club Punk Festival in London; performances include: Subway Sect, Siouxsie & the Banshees, Clash, Sex Pistols, Stinky Toys, Vibrators, The Damned, and Buzzcocks.
 Sex Pistols, members of Bromley Contingent (including Banshees Siouxsie Sioux, Steve Severin) appear live on ITV. Host Bill Grundy hits on Sioux, band unleashes a torrent of curse words.
 Daily Mirror runs headline "The Filth And The Fury!". A reaction to previous nights live ITV interview with Sex Pistols, Bromley Contingent.
 Andy Czezowski booked 3 Roxy gigs. 14 December, Generation X. 15th, Heartbreakers. 21st, Siouxsie and the Banshees, Generation X.

1977 
 Bands formed
999
 Adam and the Ants
 Angelic Upstarts
 Bad Brains
 Bags
 Big in Japan
 Black Randy and the Metrosquad
 The Blockheads
 Crass
 The Cravats
 Desperate Bicycles
 The Dickies
 Discharge
 Elvis Costello and the Attractions
 Fear
 Forgotten Rebels
 Germs
 Ebba Grön
Ilegales
 Nina Hagen Band
 KSU
 The Members
 Middle Class (band)
 The Misfits
 The Nipple Erectors
 The Pagans
 Pankrti
 Paraf
 The Proles
 Mr. Unique and the Leisure Suits
 Radio Stars
 The Rich Kids
 The Ruts
 The Skids
 The Snivelling Shits
 SODS
 Stiff Little Fingers
 The Valves
 Wipers
 X (Australia)
 X (United States)
 Albums
 Asphalt Jungle - Déconnection (EP)
 The Boomtown Rats – The Boomtown Rats
 The Boys – The Boys
 Buzzcocks – Spiral Scratch (EP)
 The Clash – The Clash (UK)
 The Damned – Damned Damned Damned
 The Damned – Music for Pleasure
 Dead Boys – Young Loud and Snotty
 The Dictators – Manifest Destiny
 Eater – The Album
 Elvis Costello – My Aim Is True
 The Heartbreakers – L.A.M.F.
 Richard Hell and the Voidoids – Blank Generation
 The Jam – In the City
 The Jam – This Is the Modern World
 Motörhead - Motörhead
 Ramones – Leave Home
 Ramones – Rocket to Russia
 The Saints – (I'm) Stranded
 Sex Pistols – Never Mind the Bollocks, Here's the Sex Pistols
The Stranglers – Rattus Norvegicus
The Stranglers – No More Heroes
The Stranglers – The Stranglers (EP)
Stinky Toys - Stinky Toys
Suicide – Suicide
Talking Heads – Talking Heads: 77
Television – Marquee Moon
Throbbing Gristle – The Second Annual Report
Ultravox! – Young Savage 7"
Ultravox! – Ha!-Ha!-Ha!
Wire – Pink Flag
Disbandments
 The Heartbreakers
 London
 Events
 Andy Czezowski opens The Roxy (London) venue in January solely for punk acts. The Clash perform opening night.
 Sex Pistols bassist Glen Matlock is fired from the Sex Pistols and is replaced with Sid Vicious. Matlock forms The Rich Kids.
 In February Howard Devoto left Buzzcocks. Guitarist Pete Shelley became the vocalist.
 The Clash begin their White Riot tour, 1 March in Guilford, supported by The Jam, Buzzcocks, The Slits and Subway Sect. After a dispute The Jam leave the tour in March.
 The Stranglers embark on a three-month nationwide tour in May They are supported by the band London.
 The Sex Pistols' single "God Save the Queen", released on 27 May, reaches number two on the British charts. Banned by BBC Radio 1 the title is left blank in the chart listings.
 In June, Sex Pistols rent a boat to traverse down the Thames during Queen Elizabeth II's Silver Jubilee anniversary celebration. Police force them to dock, several Pistols fans are arrested and injured in the meleé. Among those arrested are Pistols manager Malcolm McLaren, Vivienne Westwood, artist Jamie Reid, Tracie O'Keefe and Debbie Juvenile (Bromley Contingent).
 The Boomtown Rats appear on Top of the Pops.  The first punk/new wave band to appear.
 Roxy deejay Don Letts begins filming The Punk Rock Movie, taking London punk scene video footage and editing it into a documentary.
 On 28 October, Sex Pistols' Never Mind the Bollocks, Here's the Sex Pistols is released by Virgin Records. Despite being banned by most of Britain's record shops, reaches number one on British charts.
 In December, Elvis Costello is banned from Saturday Night Live and NBC. The studio pressured Elvis to play his single, "Less Than Zero", he instead performed his anti-media anthem, "Radio Radio".

1978 
 Bands formed
 Angry Samoans
 Charged GBH
 Cardiac Kidz
 Dead Kennedys
 Dangerous Rhythm
 Descendents
 D.O.A.
 Fastbacks
 Fatal Microbes
 Fol Jazik
 The Go-Go's
 Nervous Gender
 Pekinška Patka
 Peter and the Test Tube Babies
 The Plasmatics
 Public Image Ltd
 The Reactionaries
 The Ruts
 The Scientists
 T.S.O.L
 Social Distortion
 Splodgenessabounds
 Vice Squad
 Albums
 The Avengers – Avengers (EP)
 The Adverts – Crossing the Red Sea with the Adverts
 Big in Japan – From Y to Z and Never Again (EP)
 Blondie – Parallel Lines
 The B-52's – The B-52's
 The Boomtown Rats – A Tonic for the Troops
 Buzzcocks – Another Music in a Different Kitchen
 The Clash – Give 'Em Enough Rope
 The Dickies – The Incredible Shrinking Dickies
 Crass – The Feeding of the Five Thousand
 Dead Boys – We Have Come for Your Children
 Devo – Q: Are We Not Men? A: We Are Devo!
 Elvis Costello and the Attractions – This Year's Model
 The Forgotten Rebels – Burn the Flag (EP)
 Generation X – Generation X
 Germs – Lexicon Devil – EP
 GG Allin and The Jabbers – Always Was, Is and Always Shall Be
 The Jolt – The Jolt
 London – Animal Games
 The Lurkers – Fulham Fallout
 The Misfits – Static Age
 No New York
 Pere Ubu – The Modern Dance
 Public Image Ltd – Public Image
 Ramones – Road to Ruin
 The Rezillos – Can't Stand the Rezillos
 The Rich Kids – Ghosts of Princes in Towers
 The Saints – Eternally Yours
 Sham 69 – Tell Us the Truth
 Sham 69 – That's Life
 Siouxsie and the Banshees – The Scream
 The Suicide Commandos - Make A Record
 The Stranglers- Black and White
 Talking Heads – More Songs About Buildings and Food
 Television – Adventure
 Throbbing Gristle – D.o.A. The Third And Final Report
 Various – Live Stiffs Live
 The Vibrators – "Pure Mania"
 Wire – Chairs Missing
 Wreckless Eric – Wreckless Eric
 Wreckless Eric – The Wonderful World of Wreckless Eric
 X-Ray Spex – Germfree Adolescents
Disbandments
 Dead Boys
 Johnny Moped
 Sex Pistols
 The Suicide Commandos
 Ultravox!
 Television
 Events
 SST Records is established. Black Flag, Greg Ginn (guitarist/founder) creative outlet to release his band's music.
 Sex Pistols' disastrous January US tour ends.  Johnny Rotten walks off stage at Winterland in San Francisco, famously uttering "Ever get the feeling you've been cheated?"
Colin Brunton, The Last Pogo. Filmed in Toronto featuring local and nationals, such as The Scenics, Cardboard Brains, The Secrets, The Mods, The Ugly, The Viletones, and Teenage Head. The show ends in a riot, signaling the original first-wave end.
 Sid Vicious (Sex Pistols) is charged with murder and the stabbing death of then girlfriend Nancy Spungen, found the morning of 12 October 1978 at New York's Hotel Chelsea.
 The Boomtown Rats attain the first official UK number one single by a punk/new wave band.
 Rough Trade Records (music store originally opened in London 1976) becomes a working record label and signs almost exclusively punk inspired bands.
 Derek Jarman (Film director) releases Jubilee, cult punk-themed film, featuring Adam Ant, Toyah Willcox, Siouxsie and the Banshees, and Jordan.
 Blondie achieve worldwide success with, Parallel Lines, mixing styles of 1960s vocal pop, garage and punk rock energy. Debbie Harry becomes an icon for younger generations.

1979 
 Bands formed
 The 4-Skins
 Agent Orange
 Big Boys
 The Business
 Catholic Discipline
 Circle Jerks
 Cockney Rejects
 The Exploited
 Hüsker Dü
 MDC
 The Necros
 Mission of Burma
 NoMeansNo
 The Replacements
 Riot/Clone
 The Teen Idles
 Toy Dolls
 Slime
 The Varukers
 Albums
 Adam and the Ants – Dirk Wears White Sox
 The Adicts - Lunch with the Adicts
 The Adverts – Cast of Thousands
 Blondie – Eat to the Beat
 Buzzcocks – Singles Going Steady
 Black Flag – Nervous Breakdown (EP)
 Buzzcocks – A Different Kind of Tension
 Chelsea – Chelsea
 The Cramps- Songs the Lord Taught Us
 The Clash – London Calling
 Crass – Stations of the Crass
 The Damned – Machine Gun Etiquette
 Descendents – Ride the Wild/It's a Hectic World
 Devo – Duty Now for the Future
 The Dickies - The Incredible Shrinking Dickies
 The Dickies – Dawn of the Dickies
 Elvis Costello and the Attractions – Armed Forces
 The Fall – Live at the Witch Trials
 The Forgotten Rebels – Tomorrow belongs to us (EP)
 Gang of Four – Entertainment!
 Germs – (GI)
 The Members – At The Chelsea Nightclub
 Joy Division – Unknown Pleasures
 Madness – One Step Beyond...
 Nina Hagen Band – Nina Hagen Band
 Public Image Ltd – Metal Box
 Ramones – It's Alive
 The Ruts – The Crack
 Sex Pistols – Some Product: Carri on Sex Pistols
 Siouxsie and the Banshees – Join Hands
 The Skids – Scared to Dance
 The Slits – Cut
 The Specials – The Specials
 Stiff Little Fingers – Inflammable Material
 The Stranglers – The raven
 Swell Maps – A Trip to Marineville
 Talking Heads – Fear of Music
 Teenage Head – Teenage Head
 The Undertones – The Undertones
 The Vibrators – V2
 Wire – 154
Disbandments
 The Adverts
 Neo
 Penetration
 The Rich Kids
 X-Ray Spex
 Patti Smith Group
 Events
 Sid Vicious, Sex Pistols bassist, dies of a heroin overdose at age 21.
 Nina Hagen creates a media uproar after appearance on Austrian talk-show Club 2 discussing female orgasm and simulating masturbation.
 John Foxx left Ultravox for solo career early in the year, and replaced by ex-Rich Kids Midge Ure.
 Ramones star in the movie Rock and Roll High School.

1980s

1980 
 Bands formed
 The Adolescents
 Bad Religion
 The Fix
 GISM
 L-Seven
 The Meatmen
 Minutemen
 The Nip Drivers
 7 Seconds
 Terveet Kädet
 Minor Threat
 Reagan Youth
 Rudimentary Peni
 Subhumans
 Youth Brigade
 Albums
 Angry Samoans – Inside My Brain (EP)
 The Beat – I Just Can't Stop It
 Black Flag – Jealous Again (EP)
 Blondie – Autoamerican
 Circle Jerks – Group Sex
 The Clash – Sandinista! (triple album)
 The Damned – The Black Album
 Dead Kennedys – Fresh Fruit for Rotting Vegetables
 Discharge – Fight Back (EP)
 Discharge – Decontrol (EP)
D.O.A. – Something Better Change
Elvis Costello and the Attractions – Get Happy!!
The Forgotten Rebels – In love with the system
Elvis Costello and the Attractions – Taking Liberties
Joy Division – Closer
Minutemen – Paranoid Time
The Misfits – Beware (EP)
Nervous Gender - Live at Target (1980) 
Nina Hagen Band – Unbehagen
Peter and the Test Tube Babies – Pissed and Proud
Plasmatics – New Hope for the Wretched
The Ramones – End of the Century
Stiff Little Fingers – Nobody's Heroes
Talking Heads – Remain in Light
The Teen Idles – Minor Disturbance (EP)
Toyah – Sheep Farming in Barnet
The Undertones – Hypnotised
The Weirdos – Action-Design (EP)
X – Los Angeles
Disbandments
 Joy Division
 The Teen Idles
 Germs
 Events
 Ian Curtis, Joy Division lead singer, commits suicide 18 May 1980 at age 23. The rest of the band become New Order
 Malcolm Owen, The Ruts lead singer, dies of a heroin overdose 14 July 1980 at age 26.
 Darby Crash, singer of the Germs, commits suicide 7 December 1980 at age 22.
 KROQ-FM establishes Top 106.7 Countdowns. The Clash and Dead Kennedys both reached on it on same year.
 Penelope Spheeris (Documentary film-maker) captures L.A. punk scene in cult hit The Decline of Western Civilization. Interviews/performances with So. Cal., Alice Bag Band, Black Flag, Catholic Discipline, Circle Jerks, Fear, the Germs, and X.
 Rude Boy semi-documentary film is released. It stars Ray Gange as a roadie for The Clash and splices in live performances by the band.

1981 
Bands formed
Black Market Baby
Butthole Surfers
Dezerter
Die Kreuzen
The Faith
Government Issue
JFA
Macc Lads
The Meatmen
Negative Approach
Oi Polloi
RIOT 111
Sonic Youth
SNFU
Violent Apathy
Scream (band)
Suicidal Tendencies
 Albums
The 101ers – Elgin Avenue Breakdown
 The Adolescents – The Adolescents
 Agent Orange – Living in Darkness
 Alternative Tentacles – Let Them Eat Jellybeans!
 Bad Religion – Bad Religion (EP)
 Billy Idol – Don't Stop (EP)
 Black Flag – Damaged
 Black Flag – Six Pack (EP)
 The Cramps – Psychedelic Jungle
 Crass – Penis Envy (EP)
 Dead Boys – Night of the Living Dead Boys
 Dead Kennedys – In God We Trust Inc. (EP)
 Descendents – Fat (EP)
 Discharge – Why (EP)
 The Exploited – Punks Not Dead
 The Exploited – On Stage
JFA - Blatant Localism (EP)
Métal Urbain – Les hommes morts sont dangereux
Minor Threat - In My Eyes (EP)
Minutemen – The Punch Line
The Misfits – 3 Hits from Hell (EP)
Plasmatics – Beyond the Valley of 1984
Public Image Ltd – The Flowers of Romance
New Order – Movement
The Ramones – Pleasant Dreams
The Replacements – Sorry Ma, Forgot to Take Out the Trash
The Scientists – S/T
Slime – Slime I
Tenpole Tudor - Eddie, Old Bob, Dick and Gary, Let the Four Winds Blow
T.S.O.L. – T.S.O.L.  (EP)
T.S.O.L. – Dance with Me
The Undertones – Positive Touch
Vice Squad – Resurrection (EP)
Vice Squad – No Cause for Concern (EP)
X – Wild Gift
Disbandments
Buzzcocks
Cardiac Kidz
The Screamers
Throbbing Gristle
The Weirdos
 Events
Epitaph Records is formed. "just a logo and a P. O. box."
Henry Rollins joins Black Flag and becomes lead singer .
Cuckoo's Nest (nightclub) closes. For the last time.
Straight Edge is started.

1982 
 Bands formed
 Agnostic Front
 The Blood
 Cholera
 Crimpshrine
 Crucifucks
 D.I.
 Die Ärzte
 Die Toten Hosen
 KBO!
 O! Kult
 Tales of Terror
 The Vandals
 The Pogues
 Visací zámek
 Albums
Abrasive Wheels – When the Punks Go Marching In
Angry Samoans – Back from Samoa
Anti-Nowhere League – Anti-Nowhere League
Bad Brains – Bad Brains
Bad Religion – How Could Hell Be Any Worse?
Billy Idol – Billy Idol
Black Flag – TV Party (EP)
Black Flag – Everything Went Black
Circle Jerks – Wild in the Streets
The Clash – Combat Rock
Crass – Christ The Album
The Damned – Strawberries
Dead Kennedys – Plastic Surgery Disasters
Descendents – Milo Goes to College
Discharge – Hear Nothing See Nothing Say Nothing
Discharge – Never Again (EP)
Dischord Records – Flex Your Head
The Exploited – Troops of Tomorrow
Faith/Void – Faith/Void Split
Fear – The Record
Flipper – Album – Generic Flipper
Flux of Pink Indians – Strive to Survive Causing the Least Suffering Possible
The Forgotten Rebels – This ain’t Hollywood, this is rock and roll
GBH – City Baby Attacked By Rats
Kraut – An Adjustment to Society
Husker Du – Land Speed Record
MDC – Millions of Dead Cops
The Misfits – Walk Among Us
The Replacements – Stink (EP)
Sonic Youth -Sonic Youth
SSD (band) – The Kids Will Have Their Say
Subhumans – The Day the Country Died
Vandals – Peace thru Vandalism
Vice Squad – Stand Strong Stand Proud
X – Under the Big Black Sun
Youth Brigade – Sound & Fury
Disbandments
 Adam and the Ants
 The Adolescents
 The Slits
 Events
 December, Crass, The Mob, The Apostles members and others squat the Zig Zag in W. London. Then launch free all day event featuring anarcho-punk bands.

1983 
 Bands formed
Badmingtons
Dead Milkmen
Neon Christ
Niet
NOFX
Samhain
 Squirrel Bait
Rich Kids on LSD
 Albums
 Bad Brains – Rock for Light
 Bad Religion – Into the Unknown
 Billy Idol – Rebel Yell
 Circle Jerks – Golden Shower of Hits
 The Cramps – Smell of Female
 Crass – Yes Sir, I Will
 D.I. – D.I.
 The Dickies – Stukas Over Disneyland
 Die Toten Hosen – Opel-Gang
 Discharge – Warning: Her Majesty's Government Can Seriously Damage Your Health (EP)
 The Faith – Subject to Change
 Minor Threat – Out of Step
 Minutemen – What Makes a Man Start Fires?
 Minutemen – Buzz or Howl Under the Influence of Heat
 The Misfits – Earth A.D./Wolfs Blood
 The Ramones – Subterranean Jungle
 The Scientists – Blood Red River
 Social Distortion – Mommy's Little Monster
 Sonic Youth – Confusion Is Sex
 Subhumans – Time Flies... But Aeroplanes Crash
 Suicidal Tendencies – Suicidal Tendencies
 Toy Dolls – Dig That Groove Baby
 Violent Femmes – Violent Femmes
 X – More Fun in the New World
Disbandments
 The Faith
 Minor Threat
 The Misfits
 The Undertones
 Events
 Mick Jones is kicked out of The Clash

1984 
 Bands formed
 GWAR
 Hogan's Heroes
 Siekiera
 Uniform Choice
 Vennaskond
 The Offspring
 Albums
 Agnostic Front – Victim in Pain
 Anti-Pasti – Anti-Pasti
 Black Flag – Family Man
 Black Flag – My War
 Black Flag – Slip It In
 Cyclope - Cyclope
 Die Ärzte – Debil
 Die Kreuzen – Die Kreuzen
 Flipper – Blow'n Chunks
 Flipper – Gone Fishin'
 Flux of Pink Indians – The Fucking Cunts Treat Us Like Pricks
 Hüsker Dü – Zen Arcade
 MDC – Chicken Squawk (EP)
 Minor Threat – Minor Threat
 Minutemen – Double Nickels on the Dime
 New Model Army – Vengeance
 The Pogues – Red Roses for Me
 The Ramones – Too Tough to Die
 The Replacements – Let It Be
 Samhain – Initium
 7 Seconds – The Crew
 Subhumans – From the Cradle to the Grave
 Tales of Terror – Tales of Terror
 Talking Heads – Stop Making Sense
 Various – International P.E.A.C.E. Benefit Compilation
Disbandments
 Abrasive Wheels
 Crass
 The Members
 Events
 Another State of Mind rockumentary is released. Detailing 1982 tour of Social Distortion, Youth Brigade and small road crew as they travel across U.S. and Canada.

1985 
 Bands formed
 Dag Nasty
 I.R.A
 Parasites
 Pestes
 The Mr. T Experience
 Youth of Today
 Armia
 Albums
 Bad Religion – Back to the Known (EP)
 Black Flag – Loose Nut
 Black Flag – In My Head 
 Black Flag – The Process of Weeding Out (EP)
 Circle Jerks – Wonderful
 The Clash – Cut the Crap
 Crucifucks – The Crucifucks
 The Damned – Phantasmagoria
 D.I. – Ancient Artifacts
 D.I. – Horse Bites Dog Cries
 Die Ärzte – Im Schatten der Ärzte
 Dead Kennedys – Frankenchrist
 Dead Milkmen – Big Lizard in My Backyard
 Descendents – I Don't Want to Grow Up
 Descendents – Bonus Fat
 Die Toten Hosen – Unter falscher Flagge
 GWAR – Hell-O
 The Exploited – Horror Epics
 Fear – More Beer
 The Forgotten Rebels – Boys will be boys (EP)
 Hüsker Dü – Flip Your Wig
 Hüsker Dü – New Day Rising
 Minor Threat – Salad Days (EP)
 Minutemen – Project Mersh (EP)
 Minutemen – 3-Way Tie (For Last)
 The Misfits – Legacy of Brutality
 R.K.L. – Keep Laughing
 Samhain – Unholy Passion (EP)
 The Scientists – Demolition Derby
 7 Seconds – Walk Together, Rock Together
 Sonic Youth – Bad Moon Rising
 Subhumans – Worlds Apart
 X – Ain't Love Grand!
Disbandments
 Minutemen
 SS Decontrol
 Events
 D. Boon of Minutemen dies in a car accident
 Revolution Summer

1986 
 Bands formed
Firehose
 Good Riddance
 Jawbreaker
 J.M.K.E.
 No Doubt
 Pixies
 Propagandhi
 Screeching Weasel
 Sick of It All
 Snuff
 Soulside
 Albums
 Agnostic Front – Cause for Alarm
 Bad Brains – I Against I
 Big Black – Atomizer
 Billy Idol – Whiplash Smile
 The Cramps – A Date with Elvis
 Dag Nasty - Can I Say
 The Damned – Anything
 Dead Kennedys – Bedtime for Democracy
 Dead Milkmen – Eat Your Paisley
 Descendents – Enjoy!
 Die Ärzte – Die Ärzte
 Die Kreuzen – October File
 Die Toten Hosen – Damenwahl
 Discharge – Grave New World
 The Forgotten Rebels – The pride and the disgrace
 Gang Green – Another Wasted Night
 Hüsker Dü – Candy Apple Grey
 The Lookouts – One Planet One People
 The Misfits – Misfits (aka Collection I)
 The Ramones – Animal Boy
 Samhain – Samhain III: November-Coming-Fire
 Sonic Youth – EVOL
Disbandments
 Black Flag
 The Clash
 Elvis Costello and the Attractions
 Tales of Terror
 Events
 The Adolescents reunite.
 Lookout! Records is established. Future artists include Operation Ivy, The Donnas, Crimpshrine, Rancid and Green Day.

1987 
 Bands formed
 2 Minutos
 All
 Attaque 77
 Big Drill Car
 Fugazi
 Green Day
 Gorilla Biscuits
 La Pestilencia
 Lunachicks
 No Use for a Name
 Operation Ivy
 Rollins Band
 Backyard Babies
 Włochaty
 Albums
 The Adolescents – Brats in Battalions
 Agnostic Front – Liberty and Justice For...
 Black Flag – Annihilate This Week (EP)
 Circle Jerks – VI
 Crucifucks – Wisconsin
 Dag Nasty – Wig Out at Denko's
 Dead Kennedys – Give Me Convenience or Give Me Death
 Dead Milkmen – Bucky Fellini
 Descendents – ALL
 Descendents – Liveage
 Die Toten Hosen – Never Mind the Hosen, Here's Die Roten Rosen
 The Exploited – Live and Loud!!
 Hüsker Dü – Warehouse: Songs and Stories
 Oi Polloi – Unite and Win
 The Ramones – Halfway to Sanity
 The Scientists – The Human Jukebox
 Screeching Weasel – Screeching Weasel
 Sonic Youth – Sister
 Soulside – Less Deep Inside Keeps
 Suicidal Tendencies – Join the Army
 X – See How We Are
Disbandments
 Dead Kennedys
 Discharge
 Hüsker Dü
 Pankrti
 Samhain
 Events
 Bad Religion reunites.
 New Red Archives Records is established. Future roster includes artists UK Subs, Hogan's Heroes, Kraut, Reagan Youth, Samiam, MDC, No Use for a Name.
 Social Distortion reunites .
 Will Shatter of Flipper dies of an overdose

1988 
 Bands formed
 Anti-Flag
 Chain of Strength
 Guttermouth
 Hladno pivo
 Inside Out
 Jawbreaker
 Jughead's Revenge
 Leatherface
 Lokalne pizde
 Pennywise
 Nirvana
 Samiam
 Sublime
 Swingin' Utters
 Voodoo Glow Skulls
 Albums
 All – Allroy for Prez
 Bad Religion – Suffer
 Big Drill Car – Small Block (EP)
 D.I. – What Good Is Grief to a God?
 Dag Nasty – Field Day
 Dead Milkmen – Beelzebubba
 Descendents – Two Things at Once
 Die Ärzte – Das ist nicht die ganze Wahrheit...
 Die Kreuzen – Century Days
 Die Toten Hosen – Ein kleines bisschen Horrorschau
 Flipper – Sex Bomb Baby
 The Forgotten Rebels – Surfing on Heroin
 Fugazi – Fugazi
 Gorilla Biscuits – Gorilla Biscuits (EP)
 Hogan's Heroes – Built To Last
 NOFX – Liberal Animation
 Screeching Weasel – Boogadaboogadaboogada!
 7 Seconds – Ourselves
 Social Distortion – Prison Bound
 Sonic Youth – Daydream Nation
 Soulside – Trigger
 X – Live at the Whisky a Go-Go
Disbandments
 Big Black

1989 
 Bands formed
 Apatia
 Bouncing Souls
 Gas Huffer
 Dance Hall Crashers
 She Did The Vet
 Satanic Surfers
 The Groovie Ghoulies
 The Nation of Ulysses
 Total Chaos
 Turbonegro
 The Humpers
 Albums
 Agnostic Front – Live at CBGB
 Bad Brains – Quickness
 Bad Religion – No Control
 Big Drill Car – CD Type Thing
 Black Flag – I Can See You (EP)
 Chain of Strength – True Till Death (EP)
 D.I. – Tragedy Again
 Descendents – Hallraker
 The Forgotten Rebels – Untitled
 Fugazi – Margin Walker (EP)
 Gorilla Biscuits – Start Today
 Green Day – 1,000 Hours (EP)
 Hogan's Heroes – Built To Last
 J.M.K.E. – Külmale maale
 La Pestilencia - La Muerte...Un compromiso de todos
 Nirvana - Bleach
 NOFX – S&M Airlines
 The Offspring – The Offspring
 Operation Ivy – Energy
 The Ramones – Brain Drain
 7 Seconds – Soulforce Revolution
 Sick of It All – Blood, Sweat and No Tears
 The Vandals – Peace Thru Vandalism / When in Rome Do as The Vandals
Disbandments
 The Adolescents
 Circle Jerks
 Crimpshrine
 Operation Ivy
 Soulside
 Events
 Guitarist Greg Hetson leaves the Circle Jerks to concentrate on Bad Religion. Circle Jerks become less active.
 Dee Dee Ramone leaves The Ramones. He was replaced by C. J. Ramone, until their break up.
 Hogan's Heroes sign to New Red Archives and re-issue the successful 1988 release Built To Last on multiple formats.
 Social Distortion sign to Epic Records and record the highly successful self-titled album.

1990s

1990 
 Bands formed
 Ash
 Bikini Kill
 The Casualties
 Down By Law
 Drive Like Jehu
 Fertil Miseria
 Lagwagon
 Lifetime
 Converge
 Poor Old Lu
 The Rudiments
 Unwritten Law
 Albums
 Bad Religion – Against the Grain
 Billy Idol – Charmed Life
 The Cramps – Stay Sick!
 Die Toten Hosen – 125 Jahre auf dem Kreuzzug ins Glück
 Fuel – Monuments to Excess
 Fugazi – 13 Songs
 Fugazi – Repeater
 Green Day – Slappy (EP)
 Green Day – 39/Smooth
 Hogan's Heroes – Hogan's Heroes
 Jawbreaker – Unfun
 Jughead's Revenge – Unstuck in Time
 The Mighty Mighty Bosstones – Devil's Night Out
 No Use for a Name – Incognito
 Poison Idea – Feel the Darkness
 Samhain – Final Descent
 Social Distortion – Social Distortion
 Sonic Youth – Goo
 Snuff – Flibbiddydibbiddydob
Disbandments
 Youth of Today

1991 
 Bands formed
 AFI
 Chixdiggit
 Electric Frankenstein
 Face to Face
 Ghoti Hook
 Glü Gun
 Hi-Standard
 Horace Pinker
 I Spy
 J Church
 Mustard Plug
 No Fun At All
 The Muffs
 Pinhead Gunpowder
 Rancid
 Refused
 Shelter
 Sicko
 Unwound
 Unwritten Law
 The Suicide Machines
 Albums
 Bad Religion – 80–85
 Big Drill Car – Batch
 Bikini Kill – Revolution Girl Style Now!
 The Cramps – Look Mom No Head!
 Descendents – Somery
 Die Kreuzen – Cement
 Discharge – Massacre Divine
 Fugazi – Steady Diet of Nothing
 Gas Huffer – Janitors of Tomorrow
 Green Day – 1039/Smoothed Out Slappy Hours
 Jawbreaker – Bivouac
 Nirvana - Nevermind
 No Use for a Name – Don't Miss the Train
 NOFX – Ribbed
 NoMeansNo – 0+2=1
 The Mighty Mighty Bosstones – Where'd You Go?
 The Mighty Mighty Bosstones – More Noise and Other Disturbances
 Pennywise – Pennywise
 Screeching Weasel – My Brain Hurts
 Toy Dolls – Fat Bob's Feet
Disbandments
 Gorilla Biscuits
 Chain of Strength
 Inside Out
 Talking Heads
 Snuff
 Events
 Israel Joseph I joins Bad Brains. Drummer Earl Hudson leaves, Mackie Jayson replaces him. 
 Johnny Thunders, of New York Dolls and The Heartbreakers, dies from methadone and alcohol overdose.
 Television reunites. Records new album for Capitol Records.
 Green Day's Al Sobrante leaves and is replaced by Tre Cool.
 Events
 Dead Boys frontman Stiv Bators dies. Automobile accident.
 Fat Wreck Chords is established.
 H.R. leaves Bad Brains to go solo. Briefly replaced by Chuck Mosley ex-singer of Faith No More.
 Social Distortion gain mainstream success with their self-titled third album.  Featuring "Story of My Life", "Ball and Chain".

1992 
 Bands formed
 59 Times The Pain
 Against All Authority
 Atari Teenage Riot
 Blink-182
 Bracket
 Buck-O-Nine
 d.b.s.
 Fluf
 Frenzal Rhomb
 Harvey Danger
 Hope
 Left Front Tire
 Less Than Jake
 MxPx
 The Real McKenzies
 Plankeye
 Plow United
 The Queers
 Randy
 Reel Big Fish
 Straight Faced
 Stretch Arm Strong
 Strung Out
 Treble Charger
 Albums
Agnostic Front – One Voice
 Bad Religion – Generator
 Bikini Kill – Bikini Kill (EP)
 Dag Nasty – Four on the Floor
 Die Toten Hosen – Learning English, Lesson One
 Face to Face – Don't Turn Away
 Fifteen – The Choice of a New Generation
 Flipper – American Grafishy
 Gas Huffer – Integrity, Technology & Service
 Green Day – Kerplunk
 Hogan's Heroes – 3 Fists and a Mouthful
 Jughead's Revenge – It's Lonely at the Bottom
 Lagwagon – Duh!
 NOFX – The Longest Line (EP)
 NOFX – Maximum Rocknroll
 NOFX – White Trash, Two Heebs and a Bean
 Pennywise – A Word from the Wise/Wildcard
 Ramones – Mondo Bizarro
 Sonic Youth – Dirty
 Sublime – 40 Oz. To Freedom
 Television – Television
 The Offspring – Ignition
 Events
 Jerry Nolan of New York Dolls, dies of stroke while undergoing treatment for meningitis/pneumonia.

1993 
 Bands formed
 30 Foot Fall
 88 Fingers Louie
 98 Mute
 A
 Automatic 7
 Pezz
 Diesel Boy
 Donots
 Dogwood
 Flatcat
 Grade
 Hangnail
 Hot Water Music
 Ignite
 Jimmy Eat World
 Link 80
 Millencolin
 One Hit Wonder
 Reset
 Ruth Ruth
 Smut Peddlers
 Slapstick
 U.S. Bombs
 Ten Foot Pole
 The Hives
 The Huntingtons
 The Methadones
 The Salads
 The Spits
 The Unseen
 Albums
 AFI – Dork (EP)
 Agnostic Front – Last Warning
 Bad Brains – Rise
 Bad Religion – Recipe for Hate
 Bikini Kill – Pussy Whipped
 Billy Idol – Cyberpunk
 Blink-182 – Buddha
 Buzzcocks – Trade Test Transmissions
 Dead Milkmen – Metaphysical Graffiti
 Die Ärzte – Die Bestie in Menschengestalt
 Die Toten Hosen – Kauf MICH!
 Discharge – Shootin' Up The World
 Fugazi – In on the Kill Taker
 J.M.K.E. – Gringode Kultuur
 Jawbreaker – 24 Hour Revenge Therapy
 Lifetime – Background
 The Mighty Mighty Bosstones – Ska-Core, the Devil, and More
 No Use for a Name – The Daily Grind
 Pennywise – Unknown Road
 Propagandhi – How To Clean Everything
 The Queers – Love Songs for the Retarded"
 Rancid – Rancid
 Screeching Weasel – Wiggle
 Screeching Weasel – Anthem for a New Tomorrow
 Toy Dolls – Absurd-Ditties
 Unwritten Law – Blurr
 X – Hey Zeus!
Disbandments
 Cyclope
 The Gits
 Hogan's Heroes
 Events
 Bad Brains released their first album without the original line-up.
 Buzzcocks reform.
 GG Allin dies of accidental heroin overdose.
 The Gits, Mia Zapata is found raped and murdered.
 Reagan Youth lead singer Dave Insurgent commits suicide.

1994 
 Bands formed
 1208
 Adhesive
 Authority Zero
 Area-7
 Name Taken
 Bodyjar
 Bowling for Soup
 Choke
 Consumed
 Dillinger Four
 Goldfinger
 Gob
 Home Grown
 I Against I
 Inspection 12
 Limp
 Madcap
 Mothermania
 Ninety Pound Wuss
 Nerf Herder
 Painted Thin
 Pain
 Polikarpa y sus viciosas
 Pridebowl
 Pulley
 Riverdales
 Scuffy Dogs
 Sleater-Kinney
 Slick Shoes
 The Living End
 The Undecided
 Useless ID
 At the Drive-In
 Albums
 Avail – Dixie
 At the Drive-In – Hell Paso
 Bad Religion – Stranger Than Fiction
 Big Drill Car – No Worse for the Wear
 Blink-182 – Cheshire Cat
 Bracket – 924 Forestville St.
 The Bouncing Souls – The Good, The Bad & The Argyle
 Buck-O-Nine – Songs in the Key of Bree
 Total Chaos – Pledge of Defiance
 The Cramps – Flamejob
 Down By Law – Punkrockacademyfightsong
 D.I. – State of Shock
 The Forgotten Rebels – Criminal Zero
 Gas Huffer – One Inch Masters
 Glü Gun – Just Glü It
 Green Day – Dookie
 Jughead's Revenge – Elimination
 Lagwagon – Trashed
 Less Than Jake – Losers, Kings, and Things We Don't Understand
 The Mighty Mighty Bosstones – Question the Answers
 Millencolin – Tiny Tunes
 NOFX – Punk in Drublic
 The Offspring – Smash
 Randy – There's No Way We're Gonna Fit In
 Rancid – Let's Go
 Screeching Weasel – How to Make Enemies and Irritate People
 Sonic Youth – Experimental Jet Set, Trash and No Star
 Strung Out – Another Day In Paradise
 Sublime – Robbin' the Hood
 Ten Foot Pole – Rev
 Turbonegro – Never Is Forever
 Unwritten Law – Blue Room
 Weezer – The Blue Album
 Events
 Bad Religion's Brett Gurewitz leaves during tour, to concentrate on Epitaph Records. 
 Bad Brains reunite with all original members.
 The Circle Jerks reunite. Mercury Records releases their new album.
 Glü Gun becomes Glue Gun after releasing their first album.
 Nitro Records is established by Dexter Holland, and Grek K of Offspring .
 Snuff reform.
 Green Day, The Offspring, Bad Religion, 'NOFX, and Rancid, releases make 1994 one of the biggest years for commercial punk sales.

1995 
 Bands formed
 22 Jacks
 Ace Troubleshooter
 Agent 51
 American Steel
 Another Joe
 Audio Karate
 Belvedere
 Big D and the Kids Table
 Bickley
 Bigwig
 Bus Station Loonies
 Cauterize
 Count The Stars
 Craig's Brother
 Digger
 Dynamite Boy
 Eighteen Visions
 Fenix*TX
 Goldblade
 H2O
 Junction 18
 Kill Your Idols
 Me First and the Gimme Gimmes
 Mad Caddies
 Mest
 No Motiv
 Ozma
 Racija
 Rx Bandits
 The Ataris
 The Get Up Kids
 The O.C. Supertones
 The Reatards
 The Restarts
 Albums
 88 Fingers Louie - Behind Bars
 AFI – Answer That and Stay Fashionable
 ALL – Pummel
 Atari Teenage Riot – Delete Yourself
 Bad Brains – God of Love
 Bad Religion – All Ages
 Bouncing Souls – Maniacal Laughter
 Bracket – 4-Wheel Vibe
 Buck-O-Nine – Barfly
 Circle Jerks – Oddities, Abnormalities and Curiosities
 Crucifucks – Our Will Be Done
 The Damned – Not of This Earth
 Die Ärzte – Planet Punk
 Die Toten Hosen – Love, Peace & Money
 Face to Face – Big Choice
 Frenzal Rhomb - Coughing Up a Storm
 Fugazi – Red Medicine
 Glue Gun – The Scene Is Not for Sale
 Gob – Too Late... No Friends
 Good Riddance – For God And Country
 Green Day – Insomniac
 Hogan's Heroes – 101/3 Fists and a Mouthful
 Home Grown – That's Business
 Jawbreaker – Dear You
 Jughead's Revenge – 13 Kiddie Favorites
 Lagwagon – Hoss
 Less Than Jake – Pezcore
 Lifetime – Hello Bastards
 Millencolin – Life on a Plate
 The Misfits – Misfits II (aka Collection II)
 MxPx – On The Cover
 NOFX – I Heard They Suck Live!!
 No Use for a Name – Leche Con Carne
 Pennywise – About Time
 The Ramones – ¡Adios Amigos!
 Rancid – ...And Out Come the Wolves
 Reel Big Fish – Everything Sucks
 Sleater-Kinney – Sleater-Kinney
 SNFU – The One Voted Most Likely To Succeed
 Social Distortion – Mainliner: Wreckage From the Past
 Sonic Youth – Washing Machine
 Toy Dolls – Orcastrated
Disbandments
 Bad Brains
 Big Drill Car
 D.I.
 Macc Lads
 Siouxsie and the Banshees
 Events
 First-ever Warped Tour.

1996 
 Bands formed
 A Wilhelm Scream
 Allister
 Alkaline Trio
 Assorted Jelly Beans
 Cooter
 Bankrupt
 Catch 22
 Cigar
 Darkbuster
 Death By Stereo
 Diazepunk
 Jeffries Fan Club
 Jersey
 Fonzie
 Left Alone
 Lustra
 Dropkick Murphys
 Flashlight Brown
 Good Charlotte
 One Man Army
 Panda
 Side Walk Slam
 The Dingees
 Zebrahead
 Albums
 AFI – Very Proud of Ya
 Anti-Flag – Die for the Government
 Ash – 1977
 At the Drive-In – Acrobatic Tenement
 Bad Religion – The Gray Race
 Bikini Kill – Reject All American
 Blink-182 – They Came to Conquer... Uranus (EP)
 Bouncing Souls – Maniacal Laughter
 Descendents – Everything Sucks
 Die Ärzte – Le Frisur
 Dogwood – Good Ol' Daze
 Face to Face – Face to Face
 Five Iron Frenzy – Upbeats and Beatdowns
 Gas Huffer – The Inhuman Ordeal of Special Agent Gas Huffer
 Goldfinger – Goldfinger
 H2O – H2O
 Ignite – Past Our Means (EP)
 Jughead's Revenge – Image Is Everything
 Less Than Jake – Losing Streak
 Millencolin – Life on a Plate
 MxPx – Life in General
 MxPx – Move To Bremerton (EP)
 NOFX – Heavy Petting Zoo
 Propagandhi – Less Talk, More Rock
 The Queers – Don't Back Down"
 Reel Big Fish – Turn the Radio Off
 Sleater-Kinney – Call the Doctor
 Snuff – Demmamussabebonk
 Social Distortion – White Light, White Heat, White Trash
 Sublime – Sublime
 Unwritten Law – Oz Factor
 Weezer – Pinkerton
 Zebrahead – Yellow
Disbandments
 Jawbreaker
 The Ramones
 Sublime
 Events
 Sublime singer/guitarist Bradley Nowell dies. Heroin overdose. Sublime breaks up.
 Pennywise (Bass player) Jason Thirsk, dies suicide. Replaced by Randy Bradbury.
 The Descendents reform. Release a new album and tour.
 The Offspring leave Epitaph Records, sign to Columbia.
 Sex Pistols reunite. Release new album Filthy Lucre Live.

1997 
 Bands formed
 28 Days
 400 Blows
 Acidman
 Against Me!
 Alien Crime Syndicate
 All Star United
 Amazing Transparent Man
 Analena
 Army of Freshmen
 Autoramas
 Beautiful Skin
 Big Satan
 Bliss 66
 Born From Pain
 Burning Airlines
 By the Tree
 Calibretto 13
 Capdown
 Closet Monster
 Enemy You
 Everyday Sunday
 Flogging Molly
 Johnie All Stars
 Kid Dynamite
 Lanemeyer
 Lucky 7
 Lucky Boys Confusion
 The Blood Brothers
 The Matches
 The Movielife
 This Bike Is a Pipe Bomb
 Motion City Soundtrack
 Noise Ratchet
 Plain White T's
 Pistol Grip
 Reach The Sky
 Riverboat Gamblers
 SR-71
 Showoff
 Spunge
 The Bruce Lee Band
 Thought Riot
 Thursday
 Yellowcard
 Albums
 AFI – Shut Your Mouth and Open Your Eyes
 blink-182 – Dude Ranch
 The Bouncing Souls – Bouncing Souls
 Buck-O-Nine – 28 Teeth
 The Cramps – Big Beat from Badsville
 Dogwood – Through Thick and Thin
 Green Day – Nimrod
 Goldfinger – Hang-Ups
 H2O – Thicker Than Water
 Hot Water Music – Fuel for the Hate Game
 Hot Water Music – Forever and Counting
 Lagwagon – Double Plaidinum
 Less Than Jake – Greased
 Lifetime – Jersey's Best Dancers
 The Mighty Mighty Bosstones – Let's Face It
 Me First and the Gimme Gimmes – Have a Ball
 Millencolin – For Monkeys
 The Misfits – American Psycho
 NOFX – So Long and Thanks for All the Shoes
 The Offspring – Ixnay on the Hombre
 No Use for a Name – Making Friends
 Pennywise – Full Circle
 Reel Big Fish – Keep Your Receipt (EP)
 Save Ferris – It Means Everything
 Sleater-Kinney – Dig Me Out
 Snuff – Potatoes and Melons at Wholesale Prices Straight from the Lockup
 Toy Dolls – One More Megabyte
Disbandments
 Bikini Kill
 Glue Gun
 Events
 Bad Brains reunite. Release very early studio recordings on the EP The Omega Sessions.
 The Mighty Mighty Bosstones, The Offspring, Reel Big Fish and Social Distortion all went, 5th Annual KROQ Weenie Roast.
 Green Day's Billie Joe Armstrong starts Adeline Records
 The Misfits reunite. Release new album American Psycho. Band leader Glenn Danzig, wants nothing to do with the reunion.
 Captain Sensible rejoins The Damned.

1998 
 Bands formed
 6 Voltios
 American Hi-Fi
 Antimaniax
 Ballydowse
 CKY
 Midtown
 National Product
 Glasseater
 Emanuel
 The Deadlines
 The Distillers
 The Explosion
 One Dollar Short
 Punchline
 Jericho
 Tsunami Bomb
 Thrice
 Fuzigish
 HeyMike!
 A New Found Glory
 Over It
 Punkles
 Relient K
 Saves the Day
 Something Corporate
 Sugarcult
 Student Rick
 Unsung Zeros
 Albums
AFI – A Fire Inside (EP)
 Agnostic Front – Something's Gotta Give
 Alkaline Trio – Goddamnit
 At the Drive-in – In/Casino/Out
 Bad Religion – No Substance
 The Bouncing Souls – Tie One On
Catch 22 – Keasbey Nights
 Craig's Brother – Homecoming
 Die Ärzte – 13
 Dogwood – Dogwood
 Dropkick Murphys – Do or Die
 Dynamite Boy – Hell is Other People
 Fugazi – End Hits
 Gas Huffer – Just Beautiful Music
 Jughead's Revenge – Just Joined
 Kid Dynamite – Kid Dynamite
 Lagwagon – Let's Talk About Feelings
 Less Than Jake – Hello Rockview
 The Living End – The Living End
 Mad Caddies – Duck and Cover
 Millencolin – Same Old Tunes
 MxPx – Let It Happen
 MxPx – Slowly Going the Way of the Buffalo
 The Offspring – Americana
 Propagandhi – Where Quantity Is Job #1
 Rancid – Life Won't Wait
 Reel Big Fish – Why Do They Rock So Hard?
 Refused – The Shape of Punk To Come
 Snuff – Tweet Tweet My Lovely
 Social Distortion – Live at the Roxy
 Sonic Youth – A Thousand Leaves
 Turbonegro – Apocalypse Dudes
 Unwritten Law – Unwritten Law
 Zebrahead – Waste of Mind
Disbandments
 Refused
 Events
 Former Plasmatics singer Wendy O. Williams commits suicide.

1999 
 Bands formed
 A Loss For Words
 Children 18:3
 Di-rect
 District 7
 Gogol Bordello
 Leftöver Crack
 Much The Same
 Name Taken
 New Mexican Disaster Squad
 Pug Jelly
 Riddlin' Kids
 Rise Against
 Strike Anywhere
 Simple Plan
 Sloppy Meateaters
 Social Code
 Sum 41
 Taking Back Sunday
 The All-American Rejects
 The Frustrators
 The Lawrence Arms
 The Starting Line
 Transplants
 The F-Ups
 Toys That Kill
 Albums
7 Seconds – Good to Go
 AFI – All Hallow's (EP)
 AFI – Black Sails in the Sunset
 Agnostic Front – Riot, Riot, Upstart
 Anti-Flag – A New Kind of Army
 At the Drive-In – Vaya
 blink-182 – Enema of the State
 Blondie – No Exit
 The Bouncing Souls – Hopeless Romantic
 Bowling for Soup – Rock on Honorable Ones!!!
Catch 22 – Washed Up!
 Choking Victim – No Gods, No Managers
 The Clash – From Here to Eternity: Live
 Consumed – Hit for Six
 Death By Stereo – If Looks Could Kill I'd Watch You Die
 Dogwood – More Than Conquerors
 Down By Law – Fly the Flag (album)
 Dropkick Murphys – The Gang's All Here
 Face to Face – Ignorance Is Bliss
 Good Riddance – Operation Phoenix
 Guttermouth – Gorgeous
 H2O – F.T.T.W.
 Hi-Standard – Making the Road
 Hot Water Music – No Division
 The (International) Noise Conspiracy – The First Conspiracy
 Jughead's Revenge – Pearly Gates
 Less Than Jake – Pesto
 Long Beach Dub Allstars – Right Back
 Me First and the Gimme Gimmes – Are a Drag
 No Use for a Name – More Betterness!
 MxPx – At the Show
 Mike Ness – Cheating at Solitaire
 Mike Ness – Under the Influences
 New Found Glory – Nothing Gold Can Stay
 The Misfits – Famous Monsters
 NOFX – The Decline
 No Use for a Name – More Betterness!
 Pennywise – Straight Ahead
 Rx Bandits – Halfway Between Here and There
 Save Ferris – Modified
 Saves the Day – Through Being Cool
 Sleater-Kinney – The Hot Rock
 Joe Strummer – Rock Art and the X-Ray Style
 Ten Foot Pole – Insider
 Tiger Army – Tiger Army
 The Unseen – So This Is Freedom
 Gogol Bordello – Voi-La Intruder
Disbandments
 Choking Victim
 Events
 Bad Brains tour under the name Soul Brains due to legal issues with former label, Maverick.
 Bad Religion reunite, record song "Believe It" for The New America album.
 The Undertones reunite without Feargal Sharkey. Replaced by Paul McLoone.
 T.S.O.L., (original) Todd Barnes dies of aneuryism.

2000s

2000 
 Bands formed
 3 Feet Smaller
 Brand New
 The Dresden Dolls
 Easyway
 Flatfoot 56
 The Ergs!
 Lars Frederiksen and the Bastards
 Neverstore
 No Trigger
 Pendleton
 Roger Miret and the Disasters
 Son of Sam
 Static Thought
 Rufio
 The Fight
 The Reunion Show
 Verona Grove
 Wakefield
 Zero Down
 Zolof the Rock & Roll Destroyer
 Albums
 The (International) Noise Conspiracy – Survival Sickness
 AFI – The Art of Drowning
 Against Me! – Against Me! (EP)
 Alkaline Trio – Maybe I'll Catch Fire
 ALL – Problematic
 At the Drive-In – Relationship of Command
 Avail – One Wrench
 Bad Religion – The New America
 Blink-182 – The Mark, Tom, and Travis Show
 The Briefs – Hit After Hit
 Catch 22 – Alone in a Crowd
 The Distillers – The Distillers
 Die Ärzte – Runter mit den Spendierhosen, Unsichtbarer!
 Dogwood – Building a Better Me
 Dropkick Murphys – The Singles Collection, Volume 1
 Dynamite Hack – Superfast
 The Explosion – Flash Flash Flash
 Face to Face – Reactionary
 The Forgotten Rebels – Nobody’s Hero’s
 Green Day – Warning
 Goldfinger – Stomping Ground
 The Hives – Veni Vidi Vicious
 Ignite – A Place Called Home
 Kid Dynamite – Shorter, Faster, Louder
 Lagwagon – Let's Talk About Leftovers
 Less Than Jake – Borders and Boundaries
 The Living End – Roll On
 Mest –  Wasting Time
 Midtown – Save the World, Lose the Girl
 The Mighty Mighty Bosstones – Pay Attention
 Millencolin – Pennybridge Pioneers
 MxPx – The Ever Passing Moment
 Nerf Herder – How to Meet Girls
 No Doubt – Return of Saturn
 NOFX – Bottles to the Ground
 NOFX – Pump Up the Valuum
 The Offspring – Conspiracy of One
 Pennywise – Live @ the Key Club
 Rancid – Rancid
 Sleater-Kinney – All Hands on the Bad One
 Snuff – Numb Nuts
 Sonic Youth – NYC Ghosts & Flowers
 Sum 41 – Half Hour of Power
 Toy Dolls – Anniversary Anthems
 U.S. Crush – U.S. Crush
Disbandments
 Kid Dynamite
 The Nip Drivers
 Save Ferris
 Events
 Social Distortion, Dennis Danell dies of brain aneurysm. Replaced by Jonny Wickersham.
 Archie Comics files lawsuit with Jughead's Revenge.
 Atari Teenage Riot takes indefinite hiatus.

2001 
Bands formed
 Bobot Adrenaline
 Bombs Over Providence
 Box Car Racer
 Fall Out Boy
 Fucked Up
 Go Betty Go
 Greyfield
 Goodnight Nurse
 High Five Drive
 The Briggs
 The Goodwill
 Killradio
 Lost City Angels
 Math the Band
 My Chemical Romance
 Near Miss
 None More Black
 Par-T-One
 Patent Pending
 Teenage Bottlerocket
 The Used
 Sparta
 Albums
 311 – From Chaos
 Agnostic Front – Dead Yuppies
 Alkaline Trio – From Here To Infirmary
 ALL/Descendents – Live Plus One
 Anti-Flag – Their System Doesn't Work For You
 Anti-Flag – Underground Network
 Blink-182 – Take Off Your Pants and Jacket
 Brand New – Your Favorite Weapon
 Bouncing Souls – How I Spent My Summer Vacation
 Craig's Brother – Lost At Sea
 The Damned – Grave Disorder
 Death By Stereo – Day of the Death
 Dogwood – Matt Aragon
 Dropkick Murphys – Sing Loud Sing Proud
 Lars Frederiksen and the Bastards – Lars Frederiksen and the Bastards
 Fugazi – "The Argument
 Good Riddance – Symptoms of a Leveling Spirit
 Guttermouth – Covered With Ants
 H2O – Go
 Hot Water Music – A Flight and a Crash
 The (International) Noise Conspiracy – A New Morning, Changing Weather
 Leftöver Crack – Mediocre Generica
 Me First and the Gimme Gimmes – Blow in the Wind
 Mest –  Destination Unknown
 Misfits – Cuts from the Crypt
 Millencolin – The Melancholy Collection
 Millencolin – No Cigar
 Par-T-One – I'm So Crazy (EP)
 Pennywise – Land of the Free?
 Propagandhi – Today's Empires, Tomorrow's Ashes
 Reel Big Fish – Viva La Internet
 Rise Against – The Unraveling
 Rufio- Perhaps, I Suppose...
 Rx Bandits – Progress
 Son of Sam – Songs from the Earth
 The Strokes – Is This It
 Sum 41 – All Killer No Filler
 Strike Anywhere – Change is a Sound
 Joe Strummer and the Mescaleros – Global a Go-Go
 Tiger Army – II: Power of Moonlite
 Tilt – Been Where? Did What?
 The Unseen – The Anger & The Truth
 Useless ID – Bad Story, Happy Ending
 Vendetta Red – White Knuckled Substance
Disbandments
 22 Jacks
 At the Drive-In
 Jughead's Revenge
 Events
 The Adolescents reunite for second time.
 At the Drive-In disbands. Forms The Mars Volta, Sparta
 Atari Teenage Riot's Rapper Carl Crack dies. Suicide.
 Bad Religion returns to Epitaph Records. Brett Gurewitz rejoins, Bobby Schayer leaves. Replaced by Brooks Wackerman.
 Bus Station Loonies world record, 25 separate concerts, 12 hours. Event raises funds for music therapy equipment, for special school.
 Ramones, Joey Ramone dies from lymphoma.

2002 
 Bands formed
 Amber Pacific
 Blueprint 76
 Crime In Stereo
 Letter Kills
 Not By Choice
 Paint It Black
 Senses Fail
 The Copyrights
 The Marked Men
 The Flatliners
 The Fold
 The Swellers
 Vanilla Sky
 Albums
 1208 – Feedback Is Payback
 Against Me! – Reinventing Axl Rose
 Anti-Flag – Mobilize
 Bad Brains – I & I Survived
 Bad Religion – The Process of Belief
 Box Car Racer – Box Car Racer
 Dag Nasty – Minority of One
 D.I. – Caseyology
 Discharge – Discharge
 The Distillers – Sing Sing Death House
 The Exit – New Beat
 Face to Face – How to Ruin Everything
 Gas Huffer – The Rest of Us
 Green Day – Shenanigans
 Guttermouth – Gusto!
 Home Grown – Kings of Pop
 Hot Water Music – Caution
 Less Than Jake – Goodbye Blue & White
 The Mighty Mighty Bosstones – A Jackknife to a Swan
 Millencolin – Home from Home
 MxPx – Ten Years and Running
 Nerf Herder – American Cheese
 NOFX – 45 or 46 Songs That Weren't Good Enough to Go on Our Other Records
 No Use for a Name – Hard Rock Bottom
 Joey Ramone – Don't Worry About Me
 Reel Big Fish – Cheer Up!
 Roger Miret and the Disasters – Roger Miret and the Disasters
 Senses Fail – From the Depths of Dreams
 Sleater-Kinney – One Beat
 Sonic Youth – Murray Street
 Sum 41 – Does This Look Infected?
 Taking Back Sunday – Tell All Your Friends
 The Transplants – The Transplants
 Unwritten Law – Elva
 The Used – The Used
Disbandments
 Fenix*TX
 Events
 ALL takes hiatus.
 D.I. reunites.
 The Descendents reunite again.
 The Clash, Joe Strummer (vocalist/guitarist) dies.
 Ramones, Dee Dee Ramone (bassist) dies from heroin toxicity.
 The Ramones, Talking Heads become first punk bands inducted to Rock and Roll Hall of Fame.

2003 
 Bands formed
 Dead to Me
 Desa
 Every Avenue
 FM Static
 Hit The Lights
 Maxeen
 Melody Fall
 Halifax
 Error
 The Network
 The Wedding
 The Unlovables
 Title Fight
 Only Crime
The Wombats
 Albums
 AFI – Sing the Sorrow
 Against Me! – As the Eternal Cowboy
 Alkaline Trio – Good Mourning
 Anti-Flag – The Terror State
 Billy Talent – Billy Talent
 Blink-182 – Blink-182
 Blondie – The Curse of Blondie
 Bouncing Souls – Anchors Aweigh
 Brand New – Deja Entendu
 The Briefs – Off The Charts
 The Bronx – The Bronx
 Buzzcocks – Buzzcocks
 Catch 22 – Dinosaur Sounds
 The Cramps – Fiends of Dope Island
 Death By Stereo – Into the Valley of the Death
 Die Ärzte – Geräusch
 Dogwood – Seismic
 Dropkick Murphys – Blackout
 The Distillers – Coral Fang
 The Exploding Hearts – Guitar Romantic
 The Explosion – Sick of Modern Art
 Fall Out Boy – Take This To Your Grave
 Kid Dynamite – Cheap Shots, Youth Anthems
 Lagwagon – Blaze
 Less Than Jake – Anthem
 The Living End – Modern ARTillery
 Me First and the Gimme Gimmes – Take a Break
 Mest –  Mest
 The Misfits – Project 1950
 Motion City Soundtrack – I Am the Movie
 The Network – Money Money 2020
 NOFX – The War on Errorism
 None More Black – File Under Black
 The Offspring – Splinter
 Paint It Black – CVA
 Pennywise – From the Ashes
 Rancid – Indestructible
 Rise Against – Revolutions Per Minute
 Riverboat Gamblers – Something to Crow About
 Rufio- MCMLXXXV
 Snuff – Disposable Income
 Story of the Year – Page Avenue
 Strike Anywhere – Exit English
 Joe Strummer – Streetcore
 Swingin' Utters – Dead Flowers, Bottles, Bluegrass and Bones
 The Undertones – Get What You Need
 The Unseen – Explode
 The Used – Maybe Memories
Disbandments
 Face to Face
 Box Car Racer
 Events
 The Clash inducted to The Rock and Roll Hall of Fame.
 The Exploding Hearts, Adam Cox, Matt Fitzgerald, Jeremy Gage are killed in highway crash.

2004 
 Bands formed
 BEDlight for BlueEYES
 Better Luck Next Time
 Daggermouth
 Escape the Fate
 Hedley
 I Am The Avalanche
 Fight Fair
 Orange
 Paramore
 Permanent Me
 Pissed Jeans
 Roper
 Set Your Goals
 The King Blues
 The Falcon
 The Loved Ones
 Time Again
 Towers of London
 The Ghost of a Thousand
 Pour Habit
 Albums
 1208 – Turn of the Screw
 AFI – AFI
 Authority Zero – Andiamó
 Bad Religion – The Empire Strikes First
 The Briefs – Sex Objects
 The Casualties – On The Front Line
 The Cribs – The Cribs
 Descendents – Cool To Be You
 Descendents – 'Merican
 Dynamite Boy – Dynamite Boy
 Error – Error (EP)
 Green Day – American Idiot
 Guttermouth – Eat Your Face
 The Hives – Tyrannosaurus Hives
 The Exit – Home for an Island
 Hazen Street – Hazen Street
 Hot Water Music – The New What Next
 Jello Biafra with The Melvins – Never Breathe What You Can't See
 Killradio – Raised on Whipped Cream
 Lars Frederiksen and the Bastards – Viking
 Leftöver Crack – Fuck World Trade
 Less Than Jake – B Is for B-sides
 Me First and the Gimme Gimmes – Ruin Jonny's Bar Mitzvah
 My Chemical Romance – Three Cheers for Sweet Revenge
 Pepper – In With the Old
 Rise Against – Siren Song of the Counter Culture
 Senses Fail – Let It Enfold You
 Social Distortion – Sex, Love and Rock 'n' Roll
 Sonic Youth – Sonic Nurse
 Sum 41 – Chuck
 Toy Dolls – Our Last Album?
 A Wilhelm Scream – Mute Print
 The Used – In Love and Death
Disbandments
 Lars Frederiksen and the Bastards
 The Movielife
 Events
 Richard Hell and the Voidoids, Robert Quine dies 31 May at 61.
 Ramones, Johnny Ramone dies 15 September at 55, cancer.
 The Nils, Alex Soria dies 13 December at 39.
 Social Distortion, John Maurer leaves band after 20 years Matt Freeman takes his place.
 Dead Milkmen, Dave Schulthise takes own life 10 March at 47.
 X-Ray Spex, Jak Airport dies, cancer, 13 August.

2005 
 Bands formed
 +44
 CPC Gangbangs
 Fiasco
 Gallows
 Bomb the Music Industry!
 Broadway Calls
 Bunkface
 The God Awfuls
 Jump Ship Quick
 Mayday Parade
 Star Fucking Hipsters
 The Artist Life
 The Hoax
 True Liberty
 The Tuts
 Versus The World
 We the Kings
 The Wonder Years
 Albums
 The Adolescents – O.C. Confidential
 Against Me! – Searching for a Former Clarity
 All Time Low – The Party Scene
 The Aquabats – Charge!!
 Billy Idol – Devil's Playground
 The Briefs – Steal Yer Heart
 The Cribs – The New Fellas
 Dropkick Murphys – The Warrior's Code
 Fall Out Boy – From Under The Cork Tree
 Gas Huffer – Lemonade for Vampires
 Green Day – Bullet in a Bible
 Goldfinger – Disconnection Notice
 Jello Biafra with The Melvins – Sieg Howdy
 Paint it Black – Paradise
 Lagwagon – Live in a Dive
 Lagwagon – Resolve
 Millencolin – Kingwood
 Motion City Soundtrack – Commit This to Memory
 MxPx – Panic
 Pennywise – The Fuse
 Propagandhi – Potemkin City Limits
 Roger Miret and the Disasters – 1984
 Reel Big Fish – We're Not Happy 'til You're Not Happy
 7 Seconds – Take It Back, Take It On, Take It Over!
 Sleater-Kinney – The Woods
 Smoke or Fire – Above the City
 The Transplants – Haunted Cities
 The Unseen – State of Discontent
 Unwritten Law – Here's to the Mourning
 A Wilhelm Scream – Ruiner
Disbandments
 Blink-182
 Dynamite Boy
 Tsunami Bomb
 Wizo
 Million Dead
 Mclusky
 Events
 The Slits reunite.
 The Vandals, Steve "Stevo" Jensen dies.
 Big Boys singer Randy "Biscuit" Turner dies.
 R.K.L., Richard Manzullo dies.
 R.K.L., Lagwagon, Bad Astronaut, and The Ataris, Derrick Plourde dies.

2006 
 Bands formed
 +44
 Energy
 Ice Nine Kills
 Living Fire
 Run Kid Run
 Search the City
 Albums
 A Global Threat – Where the Sun Never Sets
 AFI – Decemberunderground
 Anti-Flag – For Blood And Empire
 Bigwig – Reclamation
 Billy Idol – Happy Holidays
 Billy Talent – Billy Talent II
 Bomb The Music Industry – Goodbye Cool World
 Bouncing Souls – The Gold Record
 Bracket – Requiem
 The Bronx – The Bronx
 The Casualties – Under Attack
 Catch 22 – Permanent Revolution
 The Explosion – Black Tape
 Fucked Up – Hidden World
 Gallows – Orchestra of Wolves
 Ignite – Our Darkest Days
 Less Than Jake – In With the Out Crowd
 The Loved Ones – Keep Your Heart
 Marianas Trench – Fix Me
 Me First and the Gimme Gimmes – Love Their Country
 New Found Glory – Coming Home
 New Mexican Disaster Squad – Don't Believe
 NOFX – Wolves in Wolves' Clothing
 None More Black – This Is Satire
 No Trigger – Canyoneer
 Rise Against – The Sufferer & the Witness
 Reel Big Fish – Our Live Album is Better Than Your Live Album
 Senses Fail – Still Searching
 Sick of It All – Death to Tyrants
 Sonic Youth – Rather Ripped
 Strike Anywhere – Dead FM
Disbandments
 The Distillers
 Mest
 None More Black
 The Suicide Machines
 Sleater-Kinney
 The F-Ups
 Events
 R.K.L., Jason Sears dies. Detox complications.
 Glue Gun reunites. with only original member Bob Oedy.
 The Last Pogo Jumps Again (Colin Brunton) begins filming. Includes clips from 1978 punk rock documentary The Last Pogo.
 Gorilla Biscuits reunite. After 15 years.
The Used, Branden Steineckert leaves. Replaced by Dan Whitesides.
 CBGB's closes.
 Rancid, Brett Reed leaves 3 November. Replaced by Branden Steineckert.

2007 
 Bands formed
 Hang 'em High
Foxboro Hot Tubs
 Albums
 Against Me! – New Wave
 Alkaline Trio – Remains
 Anti-Flag – A Benefit for Victims of Violent Crime
 A Flair for the Dramatic
 A Wilhelm Scream – Career Suicide
 All Time Low – So Wrong, It's Right
 American Steel – Destroy Their Future
 Tim Armstrong – A Poet's Life
 Bad Religion – New Maps of Hell
 Bad Brains – Build a Nation
 Buck-O-Nine – Sustain
 The Casualties – Made in NYC
 The Cribs – Men's Needs, Women's Needs, Whatever
 Crime in Stereo – Crime in Stereo Is Dead
 Dead Kennedys – Milking the Sacred Cow
 D.I. – On the Western Front
 Die Ärzte – Jazz ist anders
 Dropkick Murphys – The Meanest of Times
 Fall Out Boy – Infinity On High
 Fiasco – God Loves Fiasco
 Flatfoot 56 – Jungle of the Midwest Sea
 The Flatliners – The Great Awake
 Leftöver Crack + Citizen Fish – Deadline
 Lifetime – Lifetime
 Jay Reatard – Blood Visions
 Mad Caddies – Keep It Going
 Mayday Parade – A Lesson in Romantics
 Motion City Soundtrack – Even If It Kills Me
 MxPx – Secret Weapon
 NOFX – They've Actually Gotten Worse Live
 Only Crime – Virulence
 Reel Big Fish – Monkeys for Nothin' and the Chimps for Free
 The Queers – Munki Brain
 Smoke or Fire – This Sinking Ship
 Strung Out – Blackhawks Over Los Angeles
 Sum 41 – Underclass Hero
 The Stooges – The Weirdness
 Thrice – The Alchemy Index Vols. I & II
 The Unseen – Internal Salvation
 The Used – Berth
 The Used – Lies for the Liars
Disbandments
 Boysetsfire
 Cheap Sex
 The Explosion
 Good Riddance
 Groovie Ghoulies
 Kill Your Idols
 Much the Same
 Rufio
 Vennaskond
 Events
 Social Distortion, Brent Liles, dies. Hit by a semi truck while motorcycle riding. 
 Blitz, Alan "Nidge" Miller dies. Struck by car.
 The Circle Jerks release new song after over a decade.
 Matchbook Romance announce long-term hiatus.
 Jason Lancaster quits Mayday Parade for personal reasons, later founds Go Radio.
 Patti Smith is inducted into the Rock and Roll Hall of Fame.
 The Offspring, Atom Willard leaves. Replaced by Pete Parada.
 The Mighty Mighty Bosstones reform.
 The Ruts, Paul Fox dies. Lung cancer.
 22 Jacks reform 13 December.

2008 
 Bands formed
 180 Out
 Cerebral Ballzy
 Defeater
 Joyce Manor
 Wavves
 Albums
 Anti-Flag – The Bright Lights of America
 The Briggs – Come All You Madmen
 Bus Station Loonies – Midget Gems
 The Damned – So, Who's Paranoid?
 Dillinger Four – Civil War
 Energy - Invasions of the Mind
 Fiasco – Native Canadians
 Flogging Molly – Float
 Fucked Up – The Chemistry of Common Life
 Goldfinger – Hello Destiny
 H2O – Nothing to Prove
 Less Than Jake – GNV FLA
 The Loved Ones – Build & Burn
 Millencolin – Machine 15
 Nerf Herder – IV
 New Found Glory – Tip of the Iceberg (EP)
 No Use for a Name – The Feel Good Record of the Year
 The Offspring – Rise and Fall, Rage and Grace
 Paint it Black – New Lexicon
 Pennywise – Reason to Believe
 Rancid – B Sides and C Sides
 Rise Against – Appeal to Reason
 Senses Fail – Life Is Not a Waiting Room
 Star Fucking Hipsters – Until We're Dead
 Street Dogs – State of Grace
 Events
 Jawbreaker reform 3 January.
 Face to Face reunite for a tour 29 January.
 Descendents, Frank Navetta dies. After a short illness.
 X-Ray Spex reform for a one-off gig at Legendary Roundhouse.
 Dead Kennedys reform and tour US with new singer.
 The Sonics reform. Perform shows at The Garage, Islington, London.
 Teenage Head, Frankie Venom dies. Cancer.
 Producer/engineer Jerry Finn dies from brain hemorrhage. Known for blink-182, AFI, Rancid, Alkaline Trio, The Offspring and Morrissey.

2009 
 Bands formed
 A Common Goal
 Jello Biafra and the Guantanamo School of Medicine
 Off!
 Razors in the Night
 Sublime with Rome
 We Are In The Crowd
 FIDLAR
 Albums
 AFI – Crash Love
 Anti-Flag – The People or the Gun
 All Time Low – Nothing Personal
 Cardiac Kidz – Get Out!
 Billy Talent – Billy Talent III
 Dead To Me – African Elephants
 Death by Stereo – Death Is My Only Friend
 Gallows – Grey Britain
 Green Day – 21st Century Breakdown
 Jay Reatard – Watch Me Fall
 Jello Biafra and the Guantanamo School of Medicine – The Audacity of Hype
 Marianas Trench – Masterpiece Theatre
 Mayday Parade – Anywhere but Here
 Marked Men – Ghosts
 The Mighty Mighty Bosstones – Pin Points and Gin Joints
 New Found Glory – Not Without a Fight
 NOFX – Coaster
 Propagandhi – Supporting Caste
 Rancid – Let the Dominoes Fall
 Reel Big Fish – Fame, Fortune, and Fornication
 Sonic Youth – The Eternal
 Star Fucking Hipsters – Never Rest in Peace
 Twisted Wheel – Twisted Wheel
 The Used – Artwork
 Events
 Blink-182 reform.
 Sublime reform as Sublime with Rome. Rome, replaces late Bradley Nowell.
 Social Distortion, Charlie Quintana leaves. Replaced by Adam "Atom" Willard.
 Pennywise, Jim Lindberg leaves.

2010s

2010 
 Bands formed
 The Black Pacific
 False Idle
 No Lost Cause
 Parquet Courts
 Turnstile (band)
 The Way
 Albums
 Against Me! – White Crosses
 Alkaline Trio – This Addiction
 Bad Religion – 30 Years Live
 Bad Religion – The Dissent of Man
 The Black Pacific – The Black Pacific
 The Bouncing Souls – Ghosts on the Boardwalk
 Devo – Something for Everybody
 The Gaslight Anthem – American Slang
 Green Day – Last Night on Earth: Live in Tokyo
 Motion City Soundtrack – My Dinosaur Life
 NOFX – The Longest EP
 The Offspring – Happy Hour!
 Senses Fail – The Fire
 Pierce the Veil – Selfish Machines
 Sick of It All – Based on a True Story
 Wavves – King of the Beach
 Events
 Descendents reform.
 Transplants reform.
 Jughead's Revenge reform for 20th anniversary tour.
 The Slits, Ari Up dies. Cancer.
 The Used cancel tour, work on Artwork.
 Atari Teenage Riot reunite.
 Fall Out Boy disband.
 Jay Reatard dies of cocaine overdose.

2011 
 Bands formed
 American Standards
 Christ's Sake
 The Featherz
 The Lonely Revolts
 Pussy Riot
 The Old-Timers
 Albums
 The Adolescents – The Fastest Kid Alive
 Blink-182 – Neighborhoods
 Blondie – Panic of Girls
 Cerebral Ballzy – Cerebral Ballzy
 Craig's Brother – The Insidious Lie
 Dropkick Murphys – Going Out in Style
 Face to Face – Laugh Now, Laugh Later
 The Fall – Ersatz G.B.
 Fucked Up – David Comes to Life
 Gang of Four – Content
 Green Day – Awesome As Fuck
 Half Man Half Biscuit – 90 Bisodol (Crimond)
 Iceage – New Brigade
 Jane's Addiction – The Great Escape Artist
 Jello Biafra and the Guantanamo School of Medicine – Enhanced Methods of Questioning
 Magazine – No Thyself
 Mayday Parade – Mayday Parade
 Michael Monroe – Sensory Overdrive
 The Misfits – The Devil's Rain
 New Found Glory – Radiosurgery
 New York Dolls – Dancing Backward in High Heels
 Ramshackle Glory – Live the Dream
 Rise Against – Endgame
 Screeching Weasel – First World Manifesto
 Social Distortion – Hard Times and Nursery Rhymes
 Star Fucking Hipsters – From the Dumpster to the Grave
 Sum 41 – Screaming Bloody Murder
 Wire – Red Barked Tree
Disbandments
 Sonic Youth
'Events
 X-Ray Spex, Poly Styrene dies. Cancer.
 The Damned celebrate 35th anniversary with world tour and upcoming documentary.
 The Used leave Reprise Records/Warner. Form Anger Music Group with Hopeless.

2012 
Bands formed
 Ambassadors of Shalom
 Fear God
 Metanoia
 Platoon 1107
 Rogue Anthem
 With Confidence
Albums
All Time Low – Don't Panic
 Anti-Flag –  The General Strike
 Bad Brains – Into the Future
 Blink-182 – Dogs Eating Dogs (EP)
The Bouncing Souls – Comet
Die Ärzte – Auch
Green Day – ¡Uno!
Green Day – ¡Dos!
Green Day – ¡Tré!
MxPx – Plans Within Plans
NOFX – Self Entitled
Parquet Courts – Light Up Gold
Pennywise - All Or Nothing
Pierce the Veil – Collide with the Sky
Propagandhi - Failed States
The Offspring – Days Go By
Toy Dolls – The Album After the Last One
The Used – Vulnerable
Events
 Quicksand reforms.
 No Use for a Name, Tony Sly dies.
 Pennywise, Jim Lindberg rejoins.
 The Used cancel Canadian tour due to Bert McCracken's misdemeanor charges.

2013 
Bands formed
 Hippos of Doom
 Pup
Albums
 AFI – Burials
 Alkaline Trio – My Shame Is True
 Authority Zero – The Tipping Point
 Bad Religion – True North
 Bodyjar – Role Model
 Broadway Calls – Comfort/Distraction
 Dropkick Murphys – Signed and Sealed in Blood
 FIDLAR – Fidlar (album)
 Mayday Parade – Monsters in the Closet
 Senses Fail – Renacer
Events
 Black Flag reformed by original guitarist Greg Ginn. Releases new album What The...
 My Chemical Romance disband.

2014 
Bands formed
Glitoris 
PEARS
Albums
Against Me! – Transgender Dysphoria Blues
 Billy Idol – Kings & Queens of the Underground
 Blondie – Blondie 4(0) Ever
 Four Year Strong – Go Down in History (EP)
 Fucked Up – Glass Boys
 Joyce Manor – Never Hungover Again
 Lagwagon – Hang
 The Menzingers – Rented World
 New Found Glory – Resurrection
 OFF! – Wasted Years
Pennywise - Yesterdays
Rancid – Honor Is All We Know
Rise Against – The Black Market

2015 
Bands formed
Frank Carter & The Rattlesnakes
Karate Gossip
Albums
All Time Low – Future Hearts
Anti-Flag - American Spring
Fall Out Boy – American Beauty/American Psycho
FIDLAR - Too
Mayday Parade – Black Lines
Sleater-Kinney – No Cities to Love
The Story So Far – The Story So Far
Events
 Blink-182 band members headline articles due to very publicized statements targeting guitarist Tom Delonge's lack of commitment. He quitted the band through his manager afterwards. Later that year, Alkaline Trio frontman Matt Skiba is recruited to replace Delonge in following tour dates, and officially became permanent member.

2016 

 Bands formed
 The Chats
 Amyl and the Sniffers
Albums
Blink-182 – California
The Bouncing Souls – Simplicity
Descendents – Hypercaffium Spazzinate
Face to Face – Protection
Green Day – Revolution Radio
Ignite – A War Against You
NOFX – First Ditch Effort
PEARS – Green Star
Sum 41 – 13 Voices
Useless ID – State Is Burning
Disbandments
NoMeansNo

2017 
Albums
AFI - AFI
Anti-Flag - American Fall
The Chats - Get This in Ya!! (EP)
Idles - Brutalism
Propagandhi - Victory Lap
Rancid - Trouble Maker
Rise Against - Wolves

2018 
Bands Formed
 Side Effects
Albums
Adolescents - Cropduster
IDLES - Joy as an Act of Resistance
No Fun At All - GRIT
Parquet Courts - Wide Awake!
Pennywise - Never Gonna Die
Side Effects - Boot to the Face

2019
Bands formed
93Punx
Albums
93Punx & Vic Mensa - 93Punx
Bad Religion - Age of Unreason
Lagwagon - Railer
Sum 41 - Order in Decline
 Events
 My Chemical Romance reunites.

2020 

 Bands Formed
 Dru the Drifter

 Albums
Anti-Flag - 20/20 Vision
The Chats - High Risk Behaviour
IDLES - Ultra Mono
PEARS - PEARS

2021 

 Albums
Descendents - 9th & Walnut

See also
Flipside (fanzine)

References

Further reading 

Punk rock
Punk rock
Music history by genre
20th century in music
21st century in music